Raúl Pini (2 June 1923 – 2 October 1998) was a Uruguayan footballer. He played in 14 matches for the Uruguay national football team from 1944 to 1947. He was also part of Uruguay's squad for the 1945 South American Championship.

References

External links
 

1923 births
1998 deaths
Uruguayan footballers
Uruguay international footballers
Place of birth missing
Association football defenders
Club Nacional de Football players
Millonarios F.C. players
Racing Club de Montevideo players
Sporting Cristal footballers
Uruguayan expatriate footballers
Expatriate footballers in Colombia
Expatriate footballers in Peru